The 2004 Chinese Grand Prix (officially the 2004 Formula 1 Sinopec Chinese Grand Prix) was a Formula One motor race held on 26 September 2004 at the Shanghai International Circuit. It was Race 16 of 18 in the 2004 FIA Formula One World Championship and was the inaugural Chinese Grand Prix.

The 56-lap race was won by Rubens Barrichello for the Ferrari team, from a pole position start. Jenson Button finished second for the BAR team, with Kimi Räikkönen third in a McLaren.

Report

Background 
Michael Schumacher and Ferrari were already the drivers' and constructors' world champions. After the 2004 Italian Grand Prix, Schumacher unassailably led the drivers' standings with 38 points ahead of Rubens Barrichello and 65 points ahead of Jenson Button. Ferrari led the constructors' championship with 140 points, unassailable ahead of BAR and 143 points ahead of Renault.

Renault fired Jarno Trulli after the Italian Grand Prix and was replaced by Jacques Villeneuve, who returned to driving a single-seater after almost a year of inactivity. The dismissal of the Italian driver was due to disagreements with team manager Flavio Briatore.

This was the first race back for Ralf Schumacher after injuries in the 2004 United States Grand Prix three months prior.

Race 
Following a clean start, Rubens Barrichello won the race with Jenson Button in second and Kimi Räikkönen in third place. Michael Schumacher finished in 12th place after a race with several incidents, including a collision, a spin and a puncture.

Friday drivers
The bottom 6 teams in the 2003 Constructors' Championship were entitled to run a third car in free practice on Friday. These drivers drove on Friday but did not compete in qualifying or the race.

Classification

Qualifying 

Notes
  – Takuma Sato, Zsolt Baumgartner and Michael Schumacher received a 10-place grid penalty for engine changes.

Race

 Michael Schumacher started the race from the pitlane.

Notes 
 The race was the first where radio conversations between teams and drivers were broadcast to television viewers.

Championship standings after the race 
Bold text indicates the World Champions.

Drivers' Championship standings

Constructors' Championship standings

Note: Only the top five positions are included for both sets of standings.

References

External links

Chinese Grand Prix
Grand Prix
Chinese Grand Prix
Chinese Grand Prix